John Patrick Cooke (17 March 1939 – 9 April 2008) was a British sports shooter.

Shooting career
Cooke competed at the 1972, 1976 and the 1984 Summer Olympics. He represented England in the rapid fire pistol and the 50 metres free pistol, at the 1974 British Commonwealth Games in Christchurch, New Zealand. Four years later he represented England and won a silver medal in the rapid fire pistol, at the 1978 Commonwealth Games in Edmonton, Alberta, Canada. A third Commonwealth Games appearance for England at the 1982 Commonwealth Games in Brisbane, Queensland, Australia resulted in a gold medal in the centre fire pistol, double bronze medals in the rapid fire pistol and centre fire pistol pairs with John Gough.

References

1939 births
2008 deaths
British male sport shooters
Olympic shooters of Great Britain
Shooters at the 1972 Summer Olympics
Shooters at the 1976 Summer Olympics
Shooters at the 1984 Summer Olympics
Sportspeople from Dartford
Commonwealth Games medallists in shooting
Commonwealth Games gold medallists for England
Commonwealth Games silver medallists for England
Commonwealth Games bronze medallists for England
Shooters at the 1974 British Commonwealth Games
Shooters at the 1978 Commonwealth Games
Shooters at the 1982 Commonwealth Games
Medallists at the 1978 Commonwealth Games
Medallists at the 1982 Commonwealth Games